A.E. Orchomenos is a Greek football club, based on Orchomenos, Beotia. It was founded in 1945.

The club spent five seasons in the Greek Second Division between 1965 and 1972. Currently it plays in the First Division of the local Boeotia championships.

References

External links
Club's unofficial website

Football clubs in Central Greece
Association football clubs established in 1945
1945 establishments in Greece
Boeotia